Thomas Anthony "Tab" Baldwin  (born 16 May 1958) is an American-New Zealand basketball coach who currently serves as the head of the Gilas Pilipinas Youth national basketball program and head coach for the Ateneo Blue Eagles of the University Athletic Association of the Philippines (UAAP). Baldwin also served as a consultant of Philippine Basketball Association club team TNT Tropang Giga.

Coaching career

New Zealand
Baldwin was born in Jacksonville, Florida and played for the Bishop Kenny High School under the coaching of his father, who played basketball for Notre Dame in the 1930s. From Jacksonville Beach, he went to New Zealand in 1988 to coach the Otago Nuggets.

He was promoted with them from the second division to the NBL and then joined the Auckland Stars in 1994. In eight seasons with Auckland, he won five NBL titles (1995, 1996, 1997, 1999 and 2000), and was named NBL Coach of the Year four times (1995, 97, 99 and 2014).

He remains the most victorious coach in the history of the New Zealand NBL. Baldwin's involvement continued with the Stars as a co-owner for another eight years after he left as coach.

In 2001, he took the reins of the New Zealand national team. By winning the 2001 FIBA Oceania championship, the Tall Blacks — as New Zealand are known — qualified for the 2002 FIBA World Championship, and even reached the semi-finals; this is the best performance by an Oceania team in the history of the World Championships. Baldwin was appointed an Honorary Officer of the New Zealand Order of Merit in the 2003 New Year Honours, for services to basketball. For his achievements as coach of the New Zealand team, Baldwin was awarded the coach of the year at the Halberg awards — New Zealand's premier sports awards — for both 2001 and 2002.

Turkey, Lebanon and Jordan
Baldwin has coached Banvitspor in Turkey, PAOK Thessaloniki B.C. in Greece and U Mobitelco Cluj in Romania.

On 16 April 2010, he was appointed as Lebanon national basketball team head coach., and on 15 August 2010 Lebanon won the FIBA Asia Stanković Cup 2010 with Baldwin as head coach.

In June 2011, Baldwin was hired to coach the Jordanian national basketball team.

Philippines and Ateneo Blue Eagles
On 23 December 2014, the Samahang Basketbol ng Pilipinas formally announced the appointment of Baldwin as head coach of the Philippine men's national team (popularly known as Gilas Pilipinas), replacing Chot Reyes. Baldwin's two-year tenure as coach officially began on 1 January 2015.

On 7 December 2015, Ateneo de Manila University formally announced the hiring of Baldwin as the head coach of its collegiate men's varsity basketball team. He will be coaching the Blue Eagles in between the 2016 Olympics men's basketball qualifying tournament and the qualifying rounds for the 2019 FIBA Basketball World Cup, concentrating on the national team during the UAAP offseason. A few days later, the Ateneo management reconsidered its decision to place Baldwin as the team's head coach following an objection by the Basketball Coaches of the Philippines, and instead was to be appointed as the collegiate team's consultant.

On 18 October 2016, SBP executive director Sonny Barrios declared that Chot Reyes will return as head coach of Gilas while Baldwin will stay with the national team as the team's consultant, the same coaching setup the national team had during its historic 2013 FIBA Asia Championship and 2014 FIBA World Cup runs.

On 3 December 2017, Baldwin led the Ateneo Blue Eagles to their 9th UAAP basketball championship against the De La Salle Green Archers.

Baldwin won 2 more championships with Ateneo. In 2019, he coached the Blue Eagles to a 14-0 sweep of the elimination round of UAAP Season 82 basketball tournaments, with an average winning margin of 17.4 points per game. On 20 November, Ateneo completed the season sweep and won their third consecutive title with Baldwin by defeating the UST Growling Tigers, 86-79. In May of the same year, Baldwin was also appointed as program director for the Philippine youth national team.

In June 2021, Baldwin returned to take over as head coach of the Philippines, leading the Philippines to three wins out of three games in the final window of the 2021 FIBA Asia Cup qualification, completing a sweep for Gilas. However, weeks before the first window of the 2023 FIBA Basketball World Cup qualification, Baldwin stepped down from his post as Gilas coach, choosing to focus on Ateneo's campaign for the UAAP Season 84. He was replaced by Chot Reyes.

Summary
League Coaching Career: 
Auburn Montgomery - NCAA Division II, 1983–86
UCF - NCAA Division I, 1986–88
Otago Nuggets - NBL, 1988–90
Auckland Stars - NBL, 1994–2001
Perak Red Eagles - MNBL, 1996–1997
Banvitspor - TBL, 2004–06
PAOK Thessaloniki B.C. - A1, 2007–08
U Mobitelco Cluj -Divizia A, Dec 2007 - Jun 2009
Kepez Belediyesi S.K. - TBL, Sep 2009-Dec 2009
Sagesse Beirut - Lebanese Basketball League, 2010–12
Fujian Xunxing (China, 2012–13)
Hawke's Bay Hawks (New Zealand, 2013)
International Coaching Career: 
Head coach of New Zealand national basketball team (2001–06)
Head coach of Malaysia national basketball team (1996)
Head coach of Lebanon national basketball team (2010–2011)
Head coach of Jordanian national basketball team (2011–2012)
Head coach of Philippines men's national basketball team (2015–2016, 2021)
Other Basketball Ventures:
Team Consultant of Philippines men's national basketball team (2013–2014, 2016–present)
Team Consultant of Talk 'N Text Tropang Texters - PBA (2014–2016, 2018–2020)
Team Consultant of Ateneo de Manila University Blue Eagles - UAAP (2016)
Head coach of Ateneo de Manila University Blue Eagles - UAAP (2016–present)
Head of the Gilas Pilipinas Youth national basketball program

Personal life
Baldwin was previously married to Efthymia, originally from Greece. Efi is the owner-operator of a touring business, Definitely Greece, with tours of Greece and the Greek islands. Baldwin is committed to reside in the Philippines at least until 2019.

Coaching record

Domestic Leagues

|-
| align="left" |Otago Nuggets
| align="left" |1990
|22||4||18||.181 || align="center"| 
|-
| align="left" |Auckland Stars
| align="left" |1994
|24||15||9||.625 || align="center"| 
|-
| align="left" |Auckland Stars
| align="left" |1995
|30||27||3||.9000 || align="center"| Won 1995 NBL-New Zealand Finals
|-
| align="left" |Auckland Stars
| align="left" |1996
|28||23||5||.821 || align="center"| Won 1996 NBL-New Zealand Finals
|-
| align="left" |Auckland Stars
| align="left" |1997
|24||23||1||.958 || align="center"| Won 1997 NBL-New Zealand Finals
|-
| align="left" |Auckland Stars
| align="left" |1998
|22||16||6||.727 || align="center"| 
|-
| align="left" |Auckland Stars
| align="left" |1999
|18||14||4||.777 || align="center"| Won 1999 NBL-New Zealand Finals
|-
| align="left" |Auckland Stars
| align="left" |2000
|18||12||6||.667 || align="center"| Won 2000 NBL-New Zealand Finals
|-
| align="left" |Auckland Stars
| align="left" |2001
|17||9||8||.529 || align="center"| Lost 2001 NBL-New Zealand Semifinals
|-
| align="left" |P.A.O.K. BC
| align="left" |2008
|5||1||4||.250 || align="center"| Fired after 5 games
|-
| align="left" |Fujian Sturgeons
| align="left" |2013
|32||11||21||.343 || align="center"| 
|-class="sortbottom"
| align="center" colspan=2|Career||240|||155|||85||.645||

Collegiate record

References

External links
Basketball New Zealand profile

1958 births
Living people
American emigrants to New Zealand
American expatriate basketball people in the Philippines
Auburn University at Montgomery people
Banvit B.K. coaches
Basketball coaches from Florida
Basketball players from Florida
Basketbol Süper Ligi head coaches
New Zealand expatriate basketball people in the Philippines
New Zealand men's basketball players
New Zealand sports coaches
Officers of the New Zealand Order of Merit
P.A.O.K. BC coaches
People from Jacksonville Beach, Florida
Philippines men's national basketball team coaches
Sagesse SC basketball coaches
Ateneo Blue Eagles men's basketball coaches
Sportspeople from Jacksonville, Florida